Kawaleria Powietrzna is a Polish documentary TV series, with 26 episodes produced for Telewizja Polska in 2000. Broadcast by the TVP2 channel, it shows military training of freshmen in 25th Aeromobile Cavalry Brigade in Tomaszów Mazowiecki.

The series has caused controversy in Poland over the use of vulgarisms and harsh training methods.

Cast 
Some officers and NCOs shown in the series:
gen. bryg. Jan Kempara
ppłk Tadeusz Buk
mjr Piotr Patalong
por. Grzegorz Grodzki
ppor. Rafał Lis
por. Andrzej Kopacki
st. sierż. Jarosław Kantorowski

Episodes 
 "Bilet czyli karta powołania"
 "Wcielenie czyli ścieżka poborowego"
 "Pobudka czyli pierwsze kroki"
 "Sprawdzian czyli siła rekruta"
 "Pierwsza broń czyli kałach został moją panią"
 "Taktyka czyli będę słuchał swojego dowódcy"
 "Niedziela czyli nie ma ludzi na kompanii"
 "Floryda czyli marsz na Glinnik"
 "Wczoraj wiedziałem czyli pytanie zrozumiałem, odpowiadam"
 "Wypłata czyli prawa strona gwiżdże"
 "Przysięga czyli dzień mężczyzny"
 "Przepustka czyli krótka piłka"
 "Smutny żołnierz czyli pożegnanie z bronią"
 "Szwadron czyli metoda kropelkowa"
 "Wizyta ministra czyli nadeszła wiekopomna chwila"
 "Ostatnia pompka czyli kapral też człowiek"
 "Wierny jak pies czyli los żołnierza"
 "Zabawy na śniegu czyli poligonowy karnawał"
 "Skoki czyli wojsko leci z nieba"
 "Pi pi czyli pluton aeromobilny"
 "Bitwa z piecykiem czyli wojna o pokój"
 "Wyblinka i prusik czyli nie całuj skał"
 "Molto bene czyli Polska – Włochy 2 : 1"
 "Ei bi si czyli psi los szturmana"
 "A cóż to za wojacy czyli tak było jak było"
 "Cywil czyli zero zero de de ce"

Polish documentary television series
Polish television series
2000 Polish television series debuts
2000s Polish television series
Telewizja Polska original programming